Laurel J. Brinton (born 1953) is an American-born Canadian linguist.

Her research explores areas of Modern English grammar, historical change in English discourse markers, grammaticalization and lexification in English, corpus linguistics, and the pragmatics of English.

Her body of linguistic research spans several decades, with a focus on English linguistics. Her premier work is Lexicalization and Language Change, which focuses on understanding the relationship between lexicalization and grammaticalization in language change. The book was the first to attempt a unified report of all existing approaches to lexicalization.

She has made significant contributions in the areas of historical discourse analysis and corpus linguistics, especially with respect to historical corpora. She has completed a number of diachronic studies of the English language, including examinations of comment clauses and pragmatic markers, the latter of which has been taught as a university course with much discussion on her theories of pragmatics and discourse markers.

She was part of the team who set up the Dictionary of Canadianisms on Historical Principles, 1st edition, in an online form.

She is the daughter of Robert K. Brinton. Her sisters are epidemiologist Louise A. Brinton and author and educator Donna M. Brinton.

Academic credentials 
Dr. Brinton received her B.A. in English Literature from the University of California, Davis in 1975. Six years later, she received her Ph.D. in English with a linguistics emphasis from the University of California, Berkeley (1981) under the supervision of Julian C. Boyd. Her dissertation was entitled "The Historical Development of Aspectual Periphrases in English." She joined the faculty members at the University of British Columbia, Vancouver, after completing her doctorate degree. In 1995, she obtained the rank of Professor. She formerly served as Associate Head of the English Department for Graduate Studies at the university from 1997-1999. She served as a co-editor of the Journal of Historical Pragmatics alongside Dawn Archer from April 2013 to December 2014. She is a current member of several journal editorial boards and has reviewed for widely-known journals such as Journal of English Linguistics, Language, Journal of Pragmatics, and English Language and Linguistics, the last of which she has been a co-editor of since 2015 alongside Bernd Kortman and Patrick Honeybone.

She is currently a Professor and chair of the English Language Program in the Department of English at the University of British Columbia.

Awards and distinctions 
Brinton won the Killam Research Prize in 1998, and was awarded a Killam Faculty Research Fellowship in 2005, an award granted to "full professors at Canadian universities and research institutes, who have an outstanding reputation in their area of research.

Publications 
Authored books

Brinton, Laurel J. The Evolution of Pragmatic Markers in English: Pathways of Change. Cambridge University Press, 2017, .

Brinton, Laurel J. & Arnovick, Leslie K. The English Language: A Linguistic History. Oxford University Press, 2017 [2006], 3rd edition, .

Brinton, Laurel J. & Arnovick, Leslie K. The English Language: A Linguistic History. Oxford University Press, 2011 [2006], 2nd edition, .

Brinton, Laurel J. & Brinton, Donna M. The Linguistic Structure of Modern English. John Benjamins Publishing Company, 2010 [2000], 2nd edition, .

Brinton, Laurel J. The Comment Clause in English: Syntactic Origins and Pragmatic Development. Cambridge University Press, 2008, .

Brinton, Laurel J. & Arnovick, Leslie K. The English Language: A Linguistic History. Oxford University Press, 2006, .

Brinton, Laurel J. & Traugott, Elizabeth Closs. Lexicalization and Language Change. Cambridge University Press, 2005, .

Brinton, Laurel J. The Structure of Modern English: A Linguistic Introduction. John Benjamins Publishing Company, 2000, .

Brinton, Laurel J. Pragmatic Markers in English: Grammaticalization and Discourse Functions. Walter de Gruyter, 1996, .

Brinton, Laurel J. The Development of English Aspectual Systems: Aspectualizer and Post-verbal Particles. Cambridge University Press, 1988.  

Edited books

Brinton Laurel J. (ed.). English Historical Linguistics: Approaches and Perspectives. Cambridge University Press, 2017, .

Adams, Michael, Brinton, Laurel J. & Fulk R. D. (eds.). Studies in the History of the English Language VI: Evidence and Methods in Histories of English. Walter de Gruyter GmbH, 2015, .

Bergs, Alexander. & Brinton, Laurel J. (eds.). English Historical Linguistics: An International Handbook. Volume 2, Walter de Gruyter, 2012, .

Bergs, Alexander. & Brinton, Laurel J. (eds.). English Historical Linguistics: An International Handbook. Volume 1, Walter de Gruyter, 2012, .

Brinton, Laurel J. (ed.). Historical Linguistics 1999: Selected Papers from the 14th International Conference on Historical Linguistics. John Benjamins Publishing Company, 2001, .

Brinton, Laurel J. & Akimoto, Minoji (eds.). Collocational and Idiomatic Aspects of Composite Predicates in the History of English. John Benjamins Publishing Company, 1999, .

Articles

Brinton, Laurel J. 2014. "The extremes of insubordination: Exclamatory as if". Journal of English Linguistics 42(2). 93-113. doi:10.1177/0075424214521425

Brinton, Laurel J. 2014. "Comparative studies in early Germanic languages: With a focus on verbal categories". Diachronica 31(4). 564-570. doi: 10.1075/dia.31.4.05bri

Brinton, Laurel J. & Traugott, Elizabeth Closs. 2007. "Lexicalization and grammaticalization all over again". Historical Linguistics 2005. 3-19. doi:10.1075/cilt.284.03bri

Brinton, Laurel J. 2001. "Pathways of Change: Grammaticalization in English". Journal of English Linguistics 29(4). 372–375. Retrieved from https://doi.org/10.1177/00754240122005512

Brinton, Laurel J. 1999. "Johan Elsness, The perfect and the preterite in contemporary and earlier English". English Language and Linguistics 3(2). 353-370. doi: 10.1017/S1360674399220278

Brinton, Laurel J. 1998. "Aspectuality and countability: A cross-categorial analogy". English Language and Linguistics 2(1). 37-63. doi:10.1017/S136067430000068X

Brinton, Laurel J. 1987. "The aspectual nature of states and habits". Folia Linguistica: Acta Societatis Linguisticae Europaeae 21(2-4). 195-214. doi:10.1515/flin.1987.21.2-4.195

Brinton, Laurel J. 1987. "A linguistic approach to certain old English stylistic devices". Studia Neophilologica: A Journal of Germanic and Romance Languages and Literature 59(2), 177-185. doi:10.1080/00393278708587970

Brinton, Laurel J. 1985. "Verb particles in English: Aspect or aktionsart?" Studia Linguistica  39(2). 157-168. doi:10.1111/j.1467-9582.1985.tb00750.x

References

Living people
Place of birth missing (living people)
Linguists from Canada
Women linguists
University of California, Davis alumni
UC Berkeley College of Letters and Science alumni
Academic staff of the University of British Columbia
1953 births
American emigrants to Canada